The Pelaco Sign is a heritage-listed neon sign located in the inner Melbourne suburb of Richmond. It was erected in 1939 as an advertisement for local shirt manufacturer Pelaco.

Melbourne-based rockabilly group, The Pelaco Brothers (1974–75), were named after the sign. The Pelaco sign is visible in many scenes of the 1986 film Dogs In Space. High on a building on Richmond Hill, it can be seen from many suburbs away especially when lit at night.

The building is located at 21-31 Goodwood Street, Richmond and now houses numerous businesses including radio stations Gold 104.3 and KIIS 101.1, Madman Entertainment and media production company Fremantle Media and Authentic Entertainment.

See also
 Borsari's Corner in Carlton, Victoria
 Dingo Flour sign in North Fremantle, Western Australia
 Nylex Clock in Cremorne, Victoria
 Skipping Girl Sign in Abbotsford, Victoria

References

External links
 Melbourne Neon: Pelaco

Landmarks in Melbourne
Individual signs in Australia
Billboards
1939 establishments in Australia
Buildings and structures in the City of Yarra